Conus moylani is a species of sea snail, a marine gastropod mollusk, in the family Conidae, the cone snails and their allies.

Distribution
This species occurs off the  Solomon Islands.

References

Conidae